Jerzy Zarzycki (11 January 1911 – 2 January 1971) was a Polish film director. He directed 24 films between 1931 and 1970. He co-directed the 1933 film The Sea, which was nominated for an Academy Award in 1933 for Best Short Subject (Novelty).

Selected filmography
The Sea (1933)
Unvanquished City (1950)

References

External links

1911 births
1971 deaths
Polish film directors
Film people from Łódź